Excelsior is an unincorporated community located in the town of Richwood, Richland County, Wisconsin, United States.

Notable people
John H. Burke – U.S. Representative from California
Virgil H. Cady – Wisconsin State Assemblyman
Floyd M. McDowell – leader in the Reorganized Church of Jesus Christ of Latter Day Saints

References

Unincorporated communities in Richland County, Wisconsin
Unincorporated communities in Wisconsin